Juglandales is an order of flowering plants.  This order was recognised in several systems (e.g. Engler system and Wettstein system). The Cronquist system placed the order in the subclass Hamamelidae, as comprising the families Juglandaceae and Rhoipteleaceae, the latter consisting of only a single species. 

In the APG II system these two families are united into family Juglandaceae (with the split into two families being optional), and the family is placed in the order Fagales.

External links
The Standard Cyclopedia of Horticulture: A Discussion for the Amateur
The families and genera of vascular plants By Klaus Kubitzki
An Integrated System of Classification of Flowering Plants By Arthur Cronquist
Systematic Botany By Subhash C. Datta

Fagales
Historically recognized angiosperm orders